Little Temple is a  mountain summit located in Banff National Park of the Canadian Rockies of Alberta, Canada. The mountain can be seen from the Icefields Parkway along with its nearest higher peak, Mount Temple,  to the southwest.

Geology

Like other mountains in Banff Park, Little Temple is composed of sedimentary rock laid down during the Precambrian to Jurassic periods. Formed in shallow seas, this sedimentary rock was pushed east and over the top of younger rock during the Laramide orogeny.

Climate

Based on the Köppen climate classification, Little Temple is located in a subarctic climate with cold, snowy winters, and mild summers. Temperatures can drop below -20 °C with wind chill factors below -30 °C. Precipitation runoff from Little Temple drains into the Bow River  which is a tributary of the Saskatchewan River.

See also
 Mountain peaks of Canada
 Geography of Alberta

Gallery

References

External links
 Parks Canada web site: Banff National Park

Canadian Rockies
Mountains of Banff National Park
Two-thousanders of Alberta